Michael Kohlmann and Alexander Waske were the defending champions, but did not participate this year.

Bob Bryan and Mike Bryan won in the final 7–6(7–3), 6–4, against Mark Knowles and Daniel Nestor.

Seeds

Draw

Draw

External links
Doubles draw

Doubles